Andrea Calderwood is a British film and television producer, born in Paisley, Scotland. She won a British Academy of Film and Television Award for Best British Film for her work on The Last King of Scotland. She produced the HBO television mini-series Generation Kill.

In 2012, Scottish newspaper The Herald put her as number 42 in its list of Scotland's top 50 influential women of 2012. She produced the film Half of a Yellow Sun, which premiered in 2013 at the Toronto International Film Festival. In 2019, she produced The Boy Who Harnessed the Wind, distributed by Netflix.

Filmography

Films

Television

References

Living people
British television producers
British women television producers
British film producers
Year of birth missing (living people)